AVIATOR is a Ukrainian band, which was formed in 2005 in Kyiv, Ukraine. From the beginning, the group occupied a niche of the romantic character of pop-music, and it still remains a leader of the field. The release of the debut album «V efire» («On Air») made a splash on the national show-business market: for the first week, the band sold over 50,000 of copies, and, in total, the album has been sold in over 200,000 copies.

History

Formation and First Years (since 2005) 
The future members of the band Igor Voievutskyi and Dmytro Todoriuk got acquainted during the third season of «Shans» («Chance») TV-project in 2004. While on, the sound producer of the project was Yuriy Nikitin, a famous Ukrainian producer, and guys shared their idea to create a boys-band with him. To differ from another bands, it was decided to form a trio, so they invited Andriy Storozh to become the third member.

By the following members of the band – Igor Voievutskyi (guitar), Andriy Storozh (drums), Dmytro Todoriuk (keys) – on 29 May 2005 they played «Vozvraschaysia» («Come Back») song for the very first time at the big open-air concert on European Square in Kyiv.

Later on, the band started to work with session musicians, so Andriy started to play keyboards, and Dmytro – bass guitar.

May, 29 is a date of the official formation of the AVIATOR band. At the same day, the band released their first «Vozvraschaysia» («Come Back») video, which was on air of all Ukrainian musical channels.

The name «AVIATOR» was proposed by Storozh, because each member of the band, except music, has been interested in aviation: Igor collects children's models of airplanes, Dmytro has practiced skydiving, and Andriy is a fan of Martin Scorsese's movies, including The Aviator. Moreover, such a name conveyed  the romantic direction of the band most accurately.

So, in 2005 the band started its activity under the guidance of the «Mamamusic» Production Center.

Albums and Awards (2005 - 2009) 
On 7 December 2005 the band released their first album «V efire» («On Air»). The album had a great success: in the first 6 weeks, it was sold in more than 200,000 copies, and on 21 February 2006 the band was awarded with a Gold Album certificate for the large quantity of sales.

In three days after the award, the band started their first Ukrainian tour with such stars as Verka Serduchka, Iryna Bilyk and Mariia Burmaka. They visited 25 biggest cities of Ukraine.

In autumn 2006, the band received a «Showbiz AWARDS» in the «Best New Artist» category.

In summer 2007, their «Ryzhaya» («Coppertop») single entered the hit-parade of Russkoye Radio radio station and stayed there for 5 month in a row. At the same time, AVIATOR became a special guest of the Slavianski Bazaar in Vitebsk.

From 2005 to 2008 the group became a regular winner of the «Song of the Year» festival.

In general, the band released 3 albums and 2 re-issues: «V efire» («On Air») (2005), «V efire. Zolotoy al’bom» («On Air. Golden Album») (2006), «Maniia» («Mania») (2006), «GreenManiia» («GreenMania») (2007), «Solntce Arizony» («The Sun of Arizona») (2008).

AVIATOR has experiences in creating cover versions and remakes. The new version of the famous song «Trava u doma» («Grass Near the Home»), made by the band, became an undisputed hit. In 2009, for their version of the song, guys were awarded with the «Golden Gramophone». In addition, during the concert program, listeners can hear remakes of such songs as «Pis’ma izdaleka» («Letters From Far Away») and «You're in the Army Now».

New Achievements (2012 - 20 June 2018) 
In 2012 AVIATOR and the executives of «Mamamusic» Production Center decided to part their ways. Even after that, the rights to use the name of the band and to perform the songs were left to the band (which is a phenomenon in Ukrainian show-business).

The head of the company, Yuriy Nikitin, commented on this situation: 
.

The band continues to tour, record new songs, and shoot video works under its own label «Aviator Music».

On 29 May 2018, on the 13th birthday of AVIATOR, one of the stars of the constellation «Gemini» received the name «Gurt AVIATOR».

AVIATOR became the first singers of the Ukrainian show-business, who performed a concert aboard a plane at an altitude of 10,000 meters. It took place in the framework of the press-flight «Kyiv-Lublin» by «Bravo Airways».

Newest History of AVIATOR (20 June 2018 - present) 
In the summer of 2018, the frontline of AVIATOR stunned their fans with unexpected news: the bandmade changed. From now on, two frontmen took control of the musical «airliner»: Dmytro Todoriuk and Andriy Storozh. According to the participants themselves, even such a difficult stage of the band's development passed without a quarrel and a loud scandal:

The first concert performance in the band's new was held on 18 August 2018 at the Shyroke Aerodrome in Zaporizhzhya within the framework of the «MUZYKA TA NEBO» («MUSIC'N'SKY») Air Fest.

The official release of the «Nebo na dvoh» («Heaven a Deux») single was the starting point for a new creative career of the band. The author of the track is one of the soloists of AVIATOR Dmytro Todoriuk. Subsequently, along with the singer Bozhena Dar AVIATOR presented the anthem of the bridegroom «Narechena» («Bride»).

Members

Frontmen 

 Andriy Storozh – lead vocal, keys 
 Dmytro Todoriuk – lead vocal, acoustic guitar
 Igor Voievutskyi – lead vocal, guitar (until 20 June 2018)

Session musicians 

 Anton Schelkonogov – drums (2005-2006)
 Denys Haritonov – drums (2006-2013)
 Iryna Kristinina – back-vocal (2007-2009)
 Eve Bushmina – back-vocal (2007-2008)
 Mariia Kulish – back-vocal (2008-2013)
 Sergiy Baginskiy – solo-guitar (2012-2014)
 Kyrylo Boldyriev – drums (2013-present)
 Evgen Naumov – solo-guitar (2014-2016)
 Sergiy Goray – bass-guitar (2014-2016)
 Viacheslav Tatar – solo-guitar (2016-present)
 Dmytro Bem – bass-guitar (2018-present)
 Oleksandra Vdovichenko – back-vocal (2018-present)

Discography 

 «V efire» («On Air», Russian: «В эфире») (2005)
 «V efire. Zolotoy al’bom» («On Air. Golden Album») (2006)
«Maniia» («Mania») (2006)
«GreenManiia» («GreenMania») (2007)
«Solntce Arizony» («The Sun of Arizona») (2008)
«Evolutsiia» («Evolution») (2014)
«EVO (ReMix)» (2015)

Videos

Awards 
 Song of the Year» (2005–2008)
 Gold Album» (2006)
 Showbiz AWARDS» «Best New Artist» (2006)

External links

Publications 

 Premiere: AVIATOR Presents Bright Clip For «Сети»
 One of the Gemini Stars Received the Name of AVIATOR
 AVIATOR Presented New Song on Plane (in Ukrainian)
 Is the Heaven For Two Only? AVIATOR Presents the Track in a New Lineup
 AVIATOR and Young Zaporizhians Sang a Breathtaking Song at the Airfield (Video)(in Ukrainian)
 AVIATOR Became the Owners of an Exclusive Guitar… From Salt!(in Ukrainian)
 Bozhena Dar and AVIATOR Present the Hymn of the Newlyweds

Interviews 

 AVIATOR: We are looking forward to 2018!
 Three elements of AVIATOR
 AVIATOR: about flights, ships and people (EXCLUSIVE)

External links 
 

Musical groups established in 2005
Ukrainian pop music groups